Wahlgrens värld (in ) is a Swedish reality series following the daily lives of actress and singer Pernilla Wahlgren and her daughter, Bianca Ingrosso, alongside their other family members. The show was first broadcast on 6 October 2016, and has so far been broadcast for ten seasons on Kanal 5 and discovery +.

Premise
The show follows Pernilla Wahlgren and her family in their daily lives. These include her children, Oliver, Bianca, Benjamin, and Theo; her parents, Hans and Christina; her brother Linus, and his ex-wife, Jessica.

The series is primarily shot in Lidingö, where Pernilla lives, and Stockholm, where her daughter Bianca lives. Other locations that have featured in the show include Gothenburg, Marbella, Italy, Israel, Palma de Mallorca, and Los Angeles.

Episodes

References

Swedish television shows
Swedish reality television series